The Second Hundred Years' War is a periodization or historical era term used by some historians to describe the series of military conflicts between Great Britain and France that occurred from about 1689 (or some say 1714) to 1815. The Second Hundred Years' War is named after the Hundred Years' War, which occurred in the 14th and 15th century. The term appears to have been coined by J. R. Seeley in his influential work The Expansion of England (1883).

Background

Like the Hundred Years' War, this term does not describe a single military event but a persistent general state of war between the two primary belligerents. The use of the phrase as an overarching category indicates the interrelation of all the wars as components of the rivalry between France and Britain for world power.  It was a war between and over the future of each state's colonial empires.

The two countries remained continual antagonists even as their national identities underwent significant evolution.  Great Britain was not a single state until 1707, prior to which it was the separate kingdoms of England and Scotland, albeit with a shared Crown and military establishment.  In 1801, Britain was united with the Kingdom of Ireland to form the United Kingdom.  The period also saw France under the Bourbon dynasty, the regimes of the French Revolution and the First Empire.

The various wars between the two states during the 18th century usually involved other European countries in large alliances; except for the War of the Quadruple Alliance when they were bound by the Anglo-French Alliance, France and Britain always opposed one another. Some of the wars, such as the Seven Years' War, have been considered world wars and included battles in the growing colonies in India, the Americas, and ocean shipping routes around the globe.

Wars

Beginning: 1688–1714
The series of wars began with the accession of the Dutch William III as King of England in the Revolution of 1688.  His predecessors the Stuarts had sought friendly terms with Louis XIV: James I and Charles I, both Protestants, had avoided involvement as much as possible in the Thirty Years' War, while Charles II and the Catholic convert James II had even actively supported Louis XIV in his War against the Dutch Republic. William III, however, sought to oppose Louis XIV's Catholic regime and styled himself as a Protestant champion.  Tensions continued in the following decades, during which France protected Jacobites who sought to overthrow the later Stuarts and, after 1715, the Hanoverians.

Colonies: 1744–1783
After William III, the opposition of France and Britain shifted from religion to economy and trade: the two nations vied for colonial domination in the Americas and Asia. The Seven Years' War was one of the greatest and most decisive conflicts. France's alliance and backing of the colonists in the American Revolutionary War against Britain was successful in undermining British colonial hegemony in North America, but in turn debts from that conflict sowed the economic seeds of France's own revolution shortly thereafter.

Revolution and Empire: 1792–1815
The  French military rivalry continued with British opposition of the French Revolution and the ensuing wars with first the new French Republic and then the Empire of Napoleon.  His defeat in 1814 was followed by his abdication and exile, but he escaped the following year to begin the Hundred Days. These came to a close with his military disaster at the Battle of Waterloo, facing an Allied force commanded by the Duke of Wellington. The end of the Napoleonic Wars effectively ended the recurrent conflict between France and Britain. However, Britain and her allies' goal of restoring the French Bourbon monarchy in the Treaty of Paris and the subsequent Congress of Vienna, which sought to prevent further revolutions in Europe, ultimately failed with the later Revolutions of 1848.

Aftermath

The recurrent rhetoric used in each country shifted from references to a "natural enemy" to an agreement to tolerate one another. Common interests led the two to cooperate in the Crimean War of the 1850s.  A century after fighting one another (and with the mutual interest in checking the growing power of a united Germany, aside from Austria, with its Empire), the two were able to establish the Entente Cordiale by 1904, demonstrating that the "First" and "Second" Hundred Years' Wars were in the past; cultural differences continued, but violent conflict was over.

"Carthage" and "Rome"
Many in Europe referred to Great Britain as "Perfidious Albion", suggesting that it was a fundamentally untrustworthy nation. People compared Britain and France to ancient Carthage and Rome, respectively, with the former being cast as a greedy imperialist state that collapsed, while the latter was an intellectual and cultural capital that flourished:
The republicans knew as well as the Bourbons that British control of the oceans weighed in Continental power politics, and that France could not dominate Europe without destroying Britain. "Carthage"—vampire, tyrant of the seas, "perfidious" enemy and bearer of a corrupting commercial civilization—contrasted with "Rome", bearer of universal order, philosophy and selfless values.

Wars included in the extended conflict
 Nine Years' War (1688–1697)
 Williamite War (1688–1691)
 King William's War (1689–1697)
 War of the Spanish Succession (1701–1714)
 Queen Anne's War (1702–1713)
 War of the Austrian Succession (1742–1748)
 King George's War (1744–1748)
 1st Carnatic War (1744–1748)
 Jacobite rising of 1745 (1745–1746)
 Father Le Loutre's War (1749–1755)
 2nd Carnatic War (1749–1754)
 Seven Years' War (1756–1763)
 French and Indian War (1754–1763)
 3rd Carnatic War (1757–1763)
 Anglo-French War (1778–1783)
 American Revolutionary War (1775–1783)
 French Revolutionary Wars (1792–1802)
 War of the First Coalition (1792–1797)
 Haitian Revolution (1793–1804)
 War of the Second Coalition (1798–1802)
 Irish Rebellion of 1798 (1798)
 Napoleonic Wars (1803–1815)
 War of the Third Coalition (1803–1806)
 War of the Fourth Coalition (1806–1807)
 Peninsular War (1808–1814)
 War of the Fifth Coalition (1809)
 War of the Sixth Coalition (1812–1814)
 Hundred Days (1815)

Important figures

See also
 New France and British America
 French East India Company and British East India Company
 France–United Kingdom relations
 French–Habsburg rivalry and French–German enmity
 Long eighteenth century
 Perfidious Albion

Footnotes

References
 Blanning, T. C. W.  The Culture of Power and the Power of Culture: Old Regime Europe 1660–1789.  Oxford: Oxford University Press, 2002.
 Buffinton, Arthur H.  The Second Hundred Years' War, 1689–1815.  New York: Henry Holt and Company, 1929. 115pp
 Claydon, Tony.  William III.  Edinburgh: Pearson Education Limited, 2002.
 Crouzet, François.  "The Second Hundred Years War: Some Reflections." French History 10 (1996), pp. 432–450.
 Scott, H. M.  Review: "The Second 'Hundred Years War' 1689–1815." The Historical Journal 35 (1992), pp. 443–469.  (A collection of reviews of articles on the Anglo-French wars of the period, grouped under this heading)
 Tombs, Robert and Isabelle.  That Sweet Enemy: The French and the British from the Sun King to the Present.  London: William Heinemann, 2006.

 
17th-century conflicts
18th-century conflicts
Geopolitical rivalry
Global conflicts
Warfare of the Early Modern period
Wars involving France
Wars involving Great Britain
Wars involving the United Kingdom
History of diplomacy